Mittelreidenbach is an Ortsgemeinde - a member of the Verbandsgemeinde [United Municipalities of] Herrstein-Rhaunen - in the district of Birkenfeld in the state of Rhineland-Palatinate, in southwestern Germany.

Geography

The village lies in the Reidenbach valley southeast of the Nahe River. To the west lies Idar-Oberstein.

History
There is already the evidence of the fact that Mittelreidenbach is a very old settlement.  The stones with markings, called "Hollen- and Bellenstein" [“Hell and Bell Stones”] in the ancient times, and the eleven graves of the Huns (burial sites of the Celts) are known to be in the area of the sports fields of Mittelreidenbach.

The foundation of the present village of Mittelreidenbach goes back to the Frankish period (800-1000 AD).  In the 12th century, the settlement belonged to the district of Naumburg bei Bärenbach. In this history appears a Ritter [knight], Werner von Reidenbach, in the years between 1282 – 1287, as the resident of Hachenpfuhls (now Hachenfels) near Naumburg. In 1321 the Herren [Lords] von Reidenbach zu Dune und Stein (Oberstein, now Idar-Oberstein) were given the properties of Weiersbach and Nahbollenbach.

One of the first earliest mentions of Mittelreidenbach is found in a deed of sale in 1340, when the Edelknecht (the lowest rank of medieval German nobility) Johann von Oberstein sold the tithes in Reidenbach to the Archbishop of Trier, Baldwin of Luxembourg.  After the extinction of the family of the Ritter von Reidenbach, the properties fell to the Herren von Schwarzenberg. With the extinction of the House of Schwarzenberg in 1483, the brothers Bernhard and Jost von Flersheim in Rheinhessen inherited the village and estate of Reidenbach. Later the Reidenbach package went as the dowry of Anna, the daughter of Jost Flersheim, to Emmerich von Dietz, the district officer of St. Wendel. When the male line of the House of Dietz became extinct in 1616, the village and estate of Reidenbach were annexed as orphaned fiefs by the Archbishopric of Trier and assigned to the district of St. Wendel.  In 1779, it was transferred to the district of Oberstein.

Under the crosier of the Archbishop, Mittelreidenbach remained until Napoleon and his Grande Armée overran the Palatinate.  On 23 January 1798, the village was added to the French Empire as a part of the Département de la Saar, where it would stay in the arrondissement [prefecture] of Birkenfeld until 1814.  In 1816, the Congress of Vienna gave it to the Duchy of Saxe-Coburg-Saalfeld (after 1826, the Duchy of Saxe-Coburg and Gotha).  The Duchy assigned it to the Principality of Lichtenberg, which was administrated by town of Lichtenberg, but the Principality's distance from the Duchy proved to be problematic.  In 1834, the Principality was sold to the Kingdom of Prussia.  Mittelreidenbach became Prussian, this time in the district of St. Wendel of the Rheinprovinz [Province of the Rhineland].  With the fall of Prussia in 1918, it was added to Germany.  Since the end of World War II, Mittelreidenbach has belonged to the state of Rhineland-Palatinate.  Since the administrative reforms of 1970, it has been a member of the Verbandsgemeinde of Herrstein.

Population
The growth of the population of Mittelreidenbach, as shown by the numbers for the years between 1871 and 1987 from the national, state and local censuses:
{| border="0"
| valign="top" |

| valign="top" |
{| class="wikitable"
|- bgcolor="#eeeeee"
| Year || Residents'''
|-
| 1950 || align="right" | 536
|-
| 1961 || align="right" | 643
|-
| 1970 || align="right" | 699
|-
| 1987 || align="right" | 726
|-
| 2005 || align="right" | 786
|}
|}

Politics

Municipal council
The council is made up of 12 council members, who were elected by majority vote at the municipal election held on 7 June 2009, with the honorary mayor as the chairman.

Mayor
The mayor of Mittelreidenbach is Heidi Schappert.

Coat of arms
Mittelreidenbach's arms might be described thus: “Per pale vert a hammer and a pick per saltire surmounted by an ear of wheat couped palewise, all argent, and argent a cross gules.”

Heritage places
The following historic and cultural places of Mittelreidenbach are on the Register of Heritage Places of the State of Rheinland-Palatinate (as of 14 March 2011):
 Kirchstraße:  St. Christopher's Catholic Parish Church (Pfarrkirche St. Christophorus), Gothic Revival sandstone aisleless church, 1869-1872, architect Karl-Friedrich Müller, Saarlouis; décor
 Hauptstraße: at the cemetery, Gothic Revival cross of sandstone, crucifix of cast-iron
 Between Kirchstraße 8 and 10: Memorial of the fallen soldiers of the First World War; Christ's Cross on an elevated altar, yellow sandstone, 1926
 Kirchstraße 12:  former rectory; brick building with Gothic Revival elements, an avant-corps and a figurine-niche, 1902

Economy and infrastructure
For centuries, Mittelreidenbach was an agricultural community.  But industrialization and improved transportation in the late 19th century and afterwards brought rapid changes to the village.  In the years after World War II, the boom of prosperity allowed Mittelreidenbach to develop the “Ringstraße” and “Auf der Acht” areas in the 1960s and 1970s, to add a sewage system as well as the water supply system in 1974 and 1975, to resurface the roads and replace the 140-year-old village bridge, and to redesign the village square.  But, eventually, because there were better jobs in the neighboring towns and cities, Mittelreidenbach turned into a residential community.  Today, the only businesses in the village are two restaurants and three construction companies.

But the changes did not keep Mittelreidenbach from winning several times since 1986 in various classes of the national competition, “Our Village is Beautiful” (German: “Unser Dorf soll schöner werden”).

Transportation
To the east runs Bundesstraße 270. Serving nearby Fischbach is a railway station on the (Bingen–Saarbrücken) Line of the Nahe Valley Railway.

References

Literature
  Hermann Bruhl, Beiträge und Bilder zur Geschichte von Mittelreidenbach:  erweiterte Fassung eines Vortrages [Contributions and Pictures to the History of Mittelreidenbach:  Expanded Version of a Lecture], Schriftenreihe der Kreisvolkshochschule Birkenfeld, Nr. 26 [Publications of the Adult Education Center of the District of Birkenfeld, No. 26], Birkenfeld, Kreisvolkshochschule, 1991
  Rudi Jung, Familienbuch der katholischen Pfarreien'' [Family Book of the Catholic Parishes]: Kirchenbollenbach, Fischbach-Weierbach, Mittelreidenbach, Sien, Offenbach (Glan).  Bonn, Author, 1992

External links
 Official Website of Mittelreidenbach

Birkenfeld (district)